Doctor Who and the Warlord is a computer game based on the long-running British science fiction television series Doctor Who, released for the BBC Micro in 1985. It was promoted as part of the BBC Computer Literacy Project, with one such instance being after a 1985 screening of the 1966 film Daleks – Invasion Earth: 2150 A.D..

Gameplay

It is a text-based adventure featuring an unspecified Doctor (possibly sixth, as this was at the time). The game loaded in two parts, with a password and information from the first half needed to successfully continue into the second part.  Each part was recorded on one side of the cassette.  There were over 250 locations in each.

Development

Former series producer Graham Williams was one of the designers of the game. A ZX Spectrum version was planned but never released.

References

External links
 
 
 

1980s interactive fiction
Interactive fiction based on works
1985 video games
BBC Micro and Acorn Electron games
BBC Micro and Acorn Electron-only games
Video games based on Doctor Who
Video games developed in the United Kingdom